Dominique Desseigne (born 19 August 1944 in Commercy) is a French businessperson. He is the chief executive of Groupe Lucien Barrière.

After refusing to submit to a paternity test, he was recognized by a court of law as the father of Rachida Dati's child.

References

1944 births
Living people
People from Commercy
French businesspeople